Paduru Gururaja Bhat (1924 – 27 August, 1978) was a teacher, historian and archaeologist of Tulu Nadu and of Barkur, the ancient capital of the Tulu kingdom.

Career
Born in 1924 in the village of Paduru in Karnataka's Udupi district, Bhat graduated from the University of Madras in 1952. He received a Master's degree in History from the Banaras Hindu University in 1956 and a PhD from the University of Mysore in 1968. His thesis was entitled A Political and Cultural History of Tulu-nadu from the earliest times up to AD 1600.

Bhat taught at the Mahatma Gandhi Memorial College in Udupi, and was the founder-principal of Milagres College, Kallianpur, from 1967 to 1976.

Books
 Tulunadu
 Antiquities of South Kanara  (1969), Prabhakara Press.
 Tulunadina Nagamandala (1977), Kannada language.
 Studies in Tuluva history and culture: From the pre-historic times upto [sic] the modern (1975).
 Tulunadina Itihasadalli Sthanikaru - Devesthana Adaliteya Ithihasika Adhyayana (written in Kannada)/ Sthanikas in the History of Tulunadu - A Historical study on temple management, 1966

Another book, Temples of Dakshina Kannada, was started by P Gururaj Bhat, but was suspended for a long time after his death. The project was later completed by Prof. Muralidhara Upadhya and Dr. P N Narasimhamurthy.

References

20th-century Indian historians
Kannada-language writers
1924 births
1978 deaths
People from Udupi district
Mangaloreans
Tulu people
University of Madras alumni
Banaras Hindu University alumni
University of Mysore alumni
Scientists from Karnataka